Marius Borodine is a Canadian comedy-drama short film, directed by Emanuel Hoss-Desmarais and released in 2010. Using a mockumentary format, the film features various people discussing the life and legacy of Marius Borodine, a misunderstood scientific genius who invented a machine that could turn any waste product into potable water, but was eventually killed by falling into the machine himself.

The film stars Wilson Henley as Marius Borodine in childhood, and Vincent Hoss-Desmarais as Marius Borodine in adulthood.

The film premiered at the Just for Laughs Film Festival in July 2010. It was subsequently screened at the Fantasia Film Festival, where it won the Coup de cœur Jury Prize, and at the 2010 Toronto International Film Festival.

It was named to the Toronto International Film Festival's year-end Canada's Top Ten list for 2010, and received a Genie Award nomination for Best Live Action Short Drama at the 31st Genie Awards.

References

External links
 

2010 films
Canadian comedy-drama films
Quebec films
Canadian mockumentary films
French-language Canadian films
Canadian drama short films
Canadian comedy short films
Canadian science fiction short films
2010s Canadian films